Newspapers in Education (NiE) is a programme designed to help teachers teach children about newspapers, how they work, and how to use them. National programmes exist in more than 80 countries according to research by the World Association of Newspapers and News Publishers (WAN-IFRA)[.

New Zealand 
One example is New Zealand, where many individual newspapers had an NiE programme but these no longer exist.

 The Forum of Fargo-Moorhead
 Taranaki Daily News
 The Dominion Post
 Manawatu Evening Standard
 The Marlborough Express
 The Nelson Mail
 The Press
 The Star
 The Timaru Herald
 The Southland Times
 The Sunday Star-Times
 Waikato Times

There were different 'levels' of activity papers-one for each curriculum level:

 Go Zone Junior (Year 1-2)
 Go Zone (Year 3-4)
 i-Site (Year 5-6)
 NewsLinks (Year 7-8)
 Zoned In (Year 9-10)

USA

References

Education in New Zealand